Oswald Bastable is a fictional character created by Michael Moorcock. He is the protagonist in The Warlord of the Air, The Land Leviathan, The Steel Tsar, and appears in other stories too.

Origin in Nesbit's Oswald Bastable 

E. Nesbit created Oswald Bastable and his five siblings in the 1890s and featured them in numerous children's adventure stories narrated by Oswald (not to be confused with Nesbit's other children's fantasy adventures, Five Children and It and its sequels). Many Bastable stories were first published in magazines, not plainly as serial novels, but they are now known from the three episodic novels The Story of the Treasure Seekers (1899), The Wouldbegoods (1901), New Treasure Seekers (1904). Four more Bastable stories are in the collection Oswald Bastable and Others (1905).

Moorcock stated on the forums of his website that his use of the name "Oswald Bastable" was not supposed to directly link his character with Nesbit's (i.e. to make his novels into sequels). Rather, he said that he was trying to connect with a particular "Fabian 'liberal' imperialism, still fundamentally paternalistic but well-meaning" which he felt belonged to Nesbit's era. Edith Nesbit, who originally created the Bastable character, and her husband Hubert Bland, had been among the founders and leading members of the Fabian Society – whose proclaimed aim was to eventually get to Socialism, but in a gradual non-revolutionary way. It can be said that in practice this made its members into proponents of a continued, reformed British Empire. Moorcock's Bastable books explore various variants on the theme of Imperialism and Colonialism: the British and other colonial empires persisting into the later 20th Centuries, or conversely collapsing already in the early 1900s, and so on.

The Warlord of the Air

Oswald Bastable was Captain of the 53rd Lancers in British India, and one of four brothers.

Sent in 1902, on a mission to Kumbalari, an independent state in the North-east of the sub-continent, ruled by Sharan Kang. While there Bastable and his men are drugged  by the Kumbalaris and when attempting to make their escape through the maze-like tunnels beneath the Temple of the Future Buddha are caught in an earthquake.

Upon awakening Bastable discovers he is alone and the whole city of Teku Benga is in ruins. He is eventually rescued by an airship of the Royal Indian Air Service and discovers that seventy years have passed since he journeyed to meet Sharan Kang. Realising how it might be received if he insists on telling the truth about what has happened to him, he feigns amnesia and is eventually returned to London.

When in London, after being given a clean bill of health (apart from his 'amnesia'), he trains with the Special Air Police and is eventually given a position on the Loch Etive, a luxury airship used for round-the-world cruises. While serving on the Loch Etive he is involved in an altercation with a passenger and is eventually forced to resign from the SAP.

On his return to London he accepts a position as second officer on The Rover, a merchant airship owned and operated by Captain Korzeniowski. While en route to the Far East, Bastable discovers that the ship is carrying terrorists, but before he can alert the authorities the ship is taken over by O. T. Shaw.

The Chinese warlord takes his captured airship to the Valley of the Morning in China, where Bastable is surprised to discover a thriving community of exiled scientists from many nations, living harmoniously in a highly advanced city. Formerly a firm supporter of the civilizing influence of Empire, Bastable is shown many things in 'Dawn City' which finally convince him of the error of his outlook and agrees to pilot an airship carrying an experimental bomb to the great airship works in Hiroshima - which are being used by the combined fleets of the great nations attacking the Valley of the Morning to refuel, re-arm and repair.

Upon reaching the airfield, the bomb, which is a nuclear device, is set off and the resulting explosion sends Bastable back to 1903.

The Land Leviathan

Rescued from the sea by a Japanese fishing boat, Bastable eventually arrives at Rowe Island, where he tells his story to Michael C. Moorcock.

After recounting his tale to Moorcock Snr., he stowed away on a ship leaving Rowe Island and eventually made his way back to Teku Benga. Re-entering the maze under the Temple of the Future Buddha, hoping to return to his own world, he is again transported between the planes.

Eventually reaching a British Army outpost, he learns that a world-wide war, known as the War Between the Nations, has been raging and that this world, in which it is 1904, bears even less relation to his own 'real' time than the one he had left.

Making his way to Calcutta he falls in with some of the forces of the Arabian Alliance. Mistakenly thinking Britain is still allied with them, they give him passage on a steamer across the Indian Ocean. After entering the Red Sea the ship is sunk by the Mannanan, and the survivors left to drown.

Bastable is eventually rescued by the Lola Montez, commanded by Captain Korzeniowski. Korzeniowski agreed to drop Bastable off in southern England - though he tries to deter him, offering a place as a crew member. Bastable makes his way inland after being dropped off and ended up rescuing Una Persson from East Grinstead.

Una, who had been searching for blueprints to an O'Bean machine, gave him a lift as far as Morecambe Bay and from there he makes his way north, eventually reaching Skye and joining Korzeniowski's crew.

After some time as a privateer with Korzeniowski, they decide that it has become too dangerous to ply their trade and join the navy of Bantustan - an alternate, fully independent, enlightened and racially integrated South Africa - where they are welcome as citizens. They are taken into President Mohandas Gandhi's confidence and are held in high regard by him.

Bastable is sent with the diplomatic mission to the New Ashanti Empire at the request of General Cicero Hood and is taken to the capital, New Kumasi. Bastable had decided to assassinate General Hood, but finds himself impressed by the man, who is not at all like the stories which are told about him.

Hood learns that the Australasian-Japanese Federation are planning to attack and decides to invade the United States before they can do so on their terms. This results in the Battle of the Atlantic, which Bastable saw as an observer, and the breaking of the power of the Australasian-Japanese Federation, although the New Ashanti Empire also lost a lot of ships.

Bastable was also along when the invasion of the USA started, witnessing the conquering of New York City. Escaping from the Black Horde as it conquered Philadelphia, he made his way to Wilmington where he made contact with the American forces and was taken to Washington, D.C.

Here, he attempted to warn them of the dangers awaiting them but was unheeded and eventually ignored. Seeing many things to convince him that the people he had tried to warn deserved what was coming to them, he helped free a chain gang and sabotage some of the Whites' preparations just as the Black Horde starts its attack.

After the Battle of Washington, Bastable remained in Hood's service for a year before leaving for Bantustan, having given his manuscript into the care of Una Persson for delivery to Michael Moorcock, Snr.

The Steel Tsar

After visiting Teku Benga again, Bastable finds himself in a world where the Great Powers still held their empires and in some cases they are even bigger. Many familiar inventions are in evidence, including airships.

The world's peace is broken in 1941 when a mysterious explosion destroys Hiroshima, causing Japan to declare war on Britain. While in Singapore Bastable barely manages to escape the Japanese invasion, eventually ending up in an open motor-boat which drifts to Rowe Island. After recovering there, he is captured by the Japanese and taken to a civilian camp on Rishiri Island, from which he is rescued, along with the other prisoners, by Britain's allies the Russians; due to the October Revolution not occurring in this timeline, Alexander Kerensky has led Russia to become one of the most civilized and democratic peoples of the world.

Bastable joins the Russian Volunteer Airforce and undertakes training in Samara, where he first hears of the "Steel Tsar," Iosif Vissarionovich Djugashvili, the head of a theocratic revolutionist society. He is assigned to the Vassarion Belinsky, under Captain Leonov, which is sent to join Air Admiral Krassnov in an attack on the Free Cossack forces attacking "Yekaterinaslav" (possibly Yekaterinburg). The fleet is later attacked by a force of airships commanded by Nestor Makhno, with the result that the Vassarion Belinsky is boarded and captured and taken to Djugashvili's camp.

Seeing that Una Persson was in league with the Steel Tsar, Bastable switches allegiance, trusting Una's judgement. He witnesses the failure of Harry Birchington's mechanical Steel Tsar and is on board the Vassarion Belinsky when it is sent on its mission to bomb Makhno's camp.

While attempting to disarm the bombs, thereby discrediting Djugashvili, Cornelius Dempsey stops them and lets them leave using gliding equipment, embarking on a kamikaze mission destroying the Steel Tsar's forces. Shortly after landing, Bastable and Persson witness the flash from the explosion of the bombs over the steppe.

They are later met by horsemen from Makhno, who had managed to gain concessions from the Central Government allowing him to run his anarchist experiment.

Other books and stories

In The English Assassin he is described as a renegade Englishman and chief of General O T Shaw's air force when he attended the Peace Conference Ball. 
He was also the Captain of the airship carrying Captain Nye to meet the leader of an anarchist army camped in Glen Coe. 
He encountered Jherek Carnelian and Mrs Amelia Underwood in the Silurian (or possibly Lower Devonian) and took them to the Time Centre maintained in that period, and was seen by Jherek as a rival for the affections of Mrs Underwood.
 He is also an opium user - with opium playing somewhat the same role for him that Stormbringer does for Elric - in Moorcock's "Elric Sequence" novels.

Edith Nesbit's character, Oswald Bastable, was born 15 August, as stated on page 201, in The Wouldbegoods, published by Harper and Brothers Publishers,  New York and London (1901).

References

Alternate history characters
Fictional military captains
Michael Moorcock characters
Child characters in literature
Fictional English people